Pugo may refer to:

Boris Pugo, a Soviet politician
Pugo, La Union, a Philippine town
Pugo (comedian), a famous Filipino comedian and vaudevillian (1898-1978), born Mariano Contreras. Teamed up with Togo in the tandem Pugo and Togo and Bentot in movies, radio and television
 the Pugo dialect of the Gallong language, a Tibeto-Burman language of Northeast India
 pugo means buttocks in Esperanto